WQRF-TV (channel 39) is a television station in Rockford, Illinois, United States, affiliated with the Fox network. It is owned by Nexstar Media Group, which provides certain services to dual ABC/MyNetworkTV affiliate WTVO (channel 17) under joint sales and shared services agreements (JSA/SSA) with Mission Broadcasting. The two stations share studios on North Meridian Road in Rockford, where WQRF-TV's transmitter is also located.

History
The station signed on November 27, 1978, as the market's fourth television outlet, first broadcasting from studios located on Kishwaukee Street between State and 1st streets in downtown Rockford. It was the last full-power analog television station to sign on in Rockford, while other stations in the area since then have either been low-powered, cable-only, or on digital subchannels. Airing an analog signal on UHF channel 39, WQRF was founded by local businessman Marvin Palmquist. The channel allotment was previously used by WTVO from its sign-on in 1953 until 1967. It was promoted as an independent, "family-oriented" alternative to the area's big three network affiliates. Palmquist sold the station to Orion Broadcasting in 1984.

Overcoming a four-month wait to finally get on-the-air, WQRF's first program was an episode of the classic sitcom Gomer Pyle, U.S.M.C.. Among some of the earlier programs to also air on the station were I Love Lucy, The Bob Newhart Show, The Jeffersons, The Dick Van Dyke Show and first-run fare such as Entertainment Tonight, the original nighttime edition of Family Feud, The PTL Club and The 700 Club.

As it was the only Independent outlet in the market, WQRF stocked up much of its programming schedule with live sports including Major League Baseball (Chicago White Sox, St. Louis Cardinals and Milwaukee Brewers), the NBA (Chicago Bulls and Milwaukee Bucks), NFL preseason action (Chicago Bears) and college sports (specifically Big Ten Conference football and basketball). Orion Broadcasting sold WQRF to Family Group Broadcasting in May 1986, sharing ownership and graphical imaging with WGBA-TV in Green Bay, Wisconsin, WVFT-TV in Roanoke, Virginia, WPGX in Panama City, Florida, WFGX in Fort Walton Beach, Florida and WLAX in La Crosse, Wisconsin. The station later relocated its operations to a new building located on South Main Street/IL 2 in Rockford.

The station joined Fox in August 1989. For the network's first three years of existence, cable subscribers watched Fox through Chicago's WFLD, Madison's WMSN-TV, or Milwaukee's WCGV-TV, depending on the location. Within four years of joining Fox, WQRF ranked as one of the network's highest-rated stations. On September 12 of that year, Family Group sold the station to Petracom Broadcasting. Petracom in turn sold it to Quorum Broadcasting in 1998.

With the expansion of Fox's prime time programming and the move of sports coverage to cable on Comcast SportsNet Chicago and its forerunners and the Big Ten Network, much of WQRF's off-network reruns from yesteryear and sports coverage had gradually disappeared. The station joined Nexstar as part of the company's acquisition of Quorum Broadcasting in late 2003. On November 22, 2004, Mission Broadcasting bought WTVO from Young Broadcasting for $21 million, entered into a shared services agreement with WQRF, with WQRF moving into WTVO's studio, though WQRF is technically the senior partner.

News operation
In March 2006, WTVO began producing the market's second prime time newscast on WQRF known as Fox 39 News at 9. The broadcast only aired on weeknights unlike the area's original prime time show that was seen every night on cable-only WB affiliate "WBR" (produced by WREX). This distinction made WQRF's news Rockford's first over-the-air newscast at 9. Competition between "WBR" and WQRF was short-lived because, in late 2007, the former had its news canceled by WREX for an unknown reason. The time slot is currently used to replay the NBC outlet's weeknight 6 o'clock show on what is now CW affiliate WREX-DT2.

Another addition to local newscasts on WQRF occurred January 14, 2008, when WTVO launched Fox 39 Evening News at 6:30. Eventually, WQRF expanded Fox 39 News at 9 to a seven night operation and lengthened the weeknight version to a full hour. This station would eventually drop the 6:30 show for an unknown reason. WQRF's weeknight prime time newscast at 9 maintains a separate news anchor but features the same meteorologist and sports anchor as WTVO.

On March 5, 2012, WTVO launched a two-hour-long extension of its weekday morning show on WQRF. Known as Fox 39 News in the Morning, this can be seen from 7 until 9 offering a local alternative to the national morning programs that air on the area's big three outlets. WIFR was the first television station in Rockford to upgrade its newscasts to high definition followed by WREX on December 12, 2010. On December 18, 2012, WTVO and WQRF debuted a brand new set, news music package, and graphics scheme that is based on the Eyewitness News branding seen on other Nexstar/Mission television stations. On April 24, 2013, WQRF began broadcasting local news content in high definition.

Technical information

Subchannels
The station's digital signal is multiplexed:

Analog-to-digital conversion
WQRF-TV shut down its analog signal, over UHF channel 39, on February 17, 2009, the original target date in which full-power television stations in the United States were to transition from analog to digital broadcasts under federal mandate (which was later pushed back to June 12, 2009). The station's digital signal remained on its pre-transition UHF channel 42. Through the use of PSIP, digital television receivers display the station's virtual channel as its former UHF analog channel 39.

References

External links
 

Television channels and stations established in 1978
QRF-TV
Fox network affiliates
Bounce TV affiliates
Ion Mystery affiliates
Rewind TV affiliates
Nexstar Media Group
1978 establishments in Illinois